The Universal Atomic 4 is a four-cylinder, gasoline engine produced by the Universal Motor Company between 1949 and 1984 for use as auxiliary power on sailboats. Both  and  versions of the engine were produced.  Over 40,000 of the engines were produced during that time, with an estimated 20,000 still in use today.  

The Universal Atomic 4 was very popular in C&C, Whitby Boatworks, Northern, Catalina Yachts and Pearson Yachts sailboats, up through 1985. Starting in the early 1970s the brand Yanmar became very popular as an auxiliary power diesel engine for sailboats, in response Universal began offering a marinized version of a Kubota diesel (tractor) engine in 1976, which was popular with sailboat manufacturers, in particular Catalina. As Yanmar diesel engines continued to gain in popularity, the Universal Atomic Four gasoline engines continued to lose market share rapidly. By 1989 Yanmar had eclipsed Universal in the diesel auxiliary market with 45% market share to 42% for Universal.

History and Lineage
The Atomic 4 is descended from an earlier Universal Motor Company design called the Utility Four, which was used extensively in World War II by the United States Navy and allies to power lifeboats.  The Utility Four was replaced by the Atomic 4 in 1947.

Applications

Specifications

References

External links 
 The Care & Feeding of an Atomic 4

Marine engines